Čiflik (Serbian: Чифлик), is a village in Serbia located in the municipality of Bela Palanka, Pirot District. In 2002 it had a population of 103.

Populated places in Pirot District